= Yapes =

Coordinates: 26.8181°S 66.0781°W

- Municipality and village
- Interactive map of Yapes
- Country: Argentina
- Province: Catamarca Province
- Time zone: UTC−3 (ART)

Yapes is a village and municipality in Catamarca Province in northwestern Argentina.
